Collège Champagneur is a private French-language Roman Catholic coeducational school in Rawdon, Quebec. The school is associated with the Clerics of Saint Viator (or Clercs de Saint-Viateur in French) (C.S.V.), a Roman Catholic teaching order, and is named after Étienne Champagneur, a member of that order.

References

External links

Education in Lanaudière
Private schools in Quebec
High schools in Quebec